Sherry Gambin-Walsh is a Canadian politician, who was elected to the Newfoundland and Labrador House of Assembly in the 2015 provincial election. She represents the electoral district of Placentia-St. Mary's as a member of the Liberal Party. Prior to entering politics, Gambin-Walsh was a nurse.

Politics
Following the 2015 provincial election she served as Minister of Children, Seniors and Social Development until moving to Service NL in a 2017 cabinet shuffle.

In April 2018, Gambin-Walsh confirmed she was one of the MHAs who filed a complaint against Cabinet Minister Eddie Joyce accusing him of bullying and harassment. Joyce was subsequently removed from Cabinet and the Liberal caucus. Other allegations of bullying and harassment followed Gambin-Walsh's and the issue turned into a major political scandal.

She was re-elected in the 2019 provincial election. On April 4, 2020, Gambin-Walsh was removed from cabinet as the RCMP launched a criminal investigation into allegations that she leaked cabinet documents. On September 9, 2020 the RCMP stated that Gambin-Walsh broke cabinet confidentially by leaking information to Paul Didham, a senior police officer with the Royal Newfoundland Constabulary. The RCMP stated that Gambin-Walsh would not be charged criminally as no one benefited from the information; however Premier Furey did not reappoint her to cabinet.

She was re-elected in the 2021 provincial election.

Personal life
Gambin-Walsh has two children, one of whom is developmentally delayed.

References

Living people
Liberal Party of Newfoundland and Labrador MHAs
Members of the Executive Council of Newfoundland and Labrador
Women MHAs in Newfoundland and Labrador
21st-century Canadian politicians
21st-century Canadian women politicians
Women government ministers of Canada
Year of birth missing (living people)